Cold death may refer to:

Death
 Heat death of the universe, the Big Freeze, where the universe dies in the cold
 Death by hypothermia
 Death by cold shock response
 death, in impersonal circumstances, in loneliness, by a stone cold killer without passion

Other uses
 "A Cold Death" (episode), a 2019 TV episode of Primal (TV series)
 "Cold Death" (episode), a 1937 radio episode of The Shadow, see List of The Shadow episodes
 Brit: Cold Death (comic book), a 2003 volume of Brit (comics)
 "Cold Death" (novella), a 1955 short story by Barrington J. Bayley
 Cold Death (novel), a 1936 novel by Lawrence Donovan, see List of Doc Savage novels
 A Cold Death (novel), a 2015 Italian novel by Antonio Manzini translated by Anthony Shugaar nominated for the 2017 CWA International Dagger

See also

 A Cold Night's Death, 1973 telefilm
 Frostbite which may cause gangrene and sepsis resulting in death
 Algor mortis, the cold of death
 Lonely death
 
 Heat death (disambiguation)